The Sindh Hari Committee was a leftist and Sindhi nationalist political organization in Sindh, Pakistan that sought to promote the interests of the haris (landless peasant farmers) of Sindh. It was founded in 1930 by G. M. Syed. In 1947, Hyder Bux Jatoi took over as president of the committee until his death in 1970. In 1957 it became a constituent party of the National Awami Party.

Subsequent leaders included Azhar Jatoi (1962–2020), grandson of Hyder Bux Jatoi.

Azhar Jatoi (1962–2020)
Azhar Jatoi, chief of Sindh Hari Committee (Sindh Peasants Committee) was born on 15 February 1960 in Hyderabad, Sindh. 
He got his education up till graduation in Hyderabad and joined the hari struggle in 1982.

He strived hard for his grandfather’s mission and took its responsibility from a very early age. Just like his grandfather Hyder Bux Jatoi and father Mazhar Jatoi, Comrade Azhar Jatoi always spoke for the rights of the poor, no matter the situation he never let injustice take place in any peasant’s life. Just like his grandfather, Comrade Azhar Jatoi was also a leader who waged a struggle to awaken the downtrodden masses and make them aware of their rights. He remained associated with Anti Greater Thal Action and Kalabagh Dam Action Committee as well as Ponam, a now largely dormant conglomerate of various nationalist political parties. He actively participated in protests against the dual local government system introduced by PPP government in Sindh in 2012. 

After years of his struggle serving the hari community with his support Comrade Azhar died due to cardiac arrest on November 18, 2020. Comrade Azhar Jatoi led the Sindh Hari Committee till his death to the best of his abilities and tried to emulate his grandfather, raising voice for the downtrodden and haris at all forums. He was laid to rest in Kalhoro Colony near Hyder Bux Jatoi’s grave.

References

Political parties in Pakistan
Politics of Sindh